The canyon wren (Catherpes mexicanus) is a small North American songbird of the wren family Troglodytidae. It is resident throughout its range and is generally found in arid, rocky cliffs, outcrops, and canyons. It is a small bird that is hard to see on its rocky habitat; however, it can be heard throughout the canyons by its distinctive, loud song. It is currently in a monotypic taxon and is the only species in the genus Catherpes.

Taxonomy
The taxonomy of the species has been altered and debated for many years, with from three to eleven subspecies being proposed at various times. Generally, three subspecies are recognized. Originally in the genus Thryothorus, it was moved into the genus Salpinctes along with the rock wren (Salpinctes obsoletus), where some researchers still place it; however, generally, now, the species is in the only species in the genus Catherpes.

The three generally recognized subspecies are:
C. m. mexicanus occurring in the central and southern portions of the Mexican Plateau
C. m. albifrons occurring in the northern portion of the Mexican Plateau, into west-central through western Texas
C. m. conspersus occurring in the remaining portion of the range in the U.S. and Canada
These subspecies are distinguished by the bill of C. m. albifrons which is generally longer than that of C. m. mexicanus, and its plumage paler, with upperparts more grayish brown, with narrower black bars on tail. In C. m. conspersus the plumage is paler and it is smaller than C. m. mexicanus.

Distribution
Resident, although individuals may make short seasonal movements. It ranges from southern British Columbia in the Okanagan Valley and western and southern Idaho and southern Montana south through central Wyoming, Colorado throughout much of Mexico south to western Chiapas. It occurs east to southwest Oklahoma and in the Edwards Plateau of west-central Texas. Disjunct populations occur in the Black Hills of southwest South Dakota, northeast Wyoming and southeast Montana. During the winter season the distribution is generally the same; however, concentrations may occur in the Chihuahuan Desert of southwest Texas.

Habitat
Similar to the rock wren in habitat, the canyon wren prefers steeper rocky environments, particularly in arid landscapes and deep canyons and terrain (sometimes including buildings, woodpiles, and rock fences). This species regularly uses riparian areas for foraging and has bred away from rocky substrate.

Diet
The canyon wren feeds on small insects and spiders. Since they live on large rocks, they use their long beaks to scope out small crevices. They also get their source of liquid from the insects they consume.

Ecology
It feeds on insects and spiders by probing into crevices with its long bill. Its coloration is rustier than that of the rock wren, with a contrasting white throat and breast. The canyon wren is more often heard than seen, and its falling series of whistles is one of the more familiar bird calls of the canyons of the western United States.

It builds a cup nest out of twigs and other vegetation in a rock crevice. It lays 4 to 6 eggs, white with reddish brown and gray speckles. This species will use buildings to place its nest on and along the Bill Williams River a nest was found in a palm tree.

References

Cited texts

External links
Canyon Wren at USGS Patuxent Bird Identification InfoCenter
Canyon Wren Species Account - Cornell Lab of Ornithology
Canyon Wren on the Internet Bird Collection
Canyon Wren photo gallery VIREO
Photo-High Res--(Close-up); Article - i.pbase.com-(Photos)

Troglodytidae
Birds of North America
Native birds of the Western United States
Birds of the Great Basin
Birds of Mexico
Fauna of the Sonoran Desert
Fauna of the California chaparral and woodlands
Birds described in 1829